USS Gladiator (MCM-11) is an  of the United States Navy, and is the third U.S. Navy ship to bear that name.

Awards
Navy Unit Commendation
Navy E Ribbon
National Defense Service Medal with star
Global War on Terrorism Expeditionary Medal
Global War on Terrorism Service Medal
Sea Service Deployment Ribbon

In popular culture
The ship was featured in Mega Movers, when it was transported to Bahrain on top of a heavy lift ship.

References

External links

USS Gladiator official website
U.S. Naval Historical Center: USS Gladiator
NavSource Online: USS Gladiator

Unofficial U.S. Navy Site: USS Gladiator
Military Sealift Command: "A Curious Cargo", By Laura M. Seal
 

Avenger-class mine countermeasures ships
Ships built by Peterson Builders
1991 ships
Minehunters of the United States